"One Million Kisses" is a song by the band Rufus, released as a single in 1983 from the live album Stompin' at the Savoy. The song is the second and final single from the album, the follow-up to "Ain't Nobody", both released as studio bonus tracks.

Track listing
 One Million Kisses
 One Million Kisses (12" version)
 Try a Little Understanding
 Don't Go to Strangers

References

1983 singles
1983 songs
Songs written by Jeffrey Osborne